Grahame Morris Budge (7 November 1920 - 14 November 1979) was a Scotland rugby player. He played four times for Scotland and once for the British Isles against New Zealand.

Career 
He played for various clubs, which included Dunbar RFC, where the club's historian, from a later generation, would record him as being a local lad who played for Dunbar RFC both before and after the Second World War before moving on to play for Edinburgh Wanderers, later still Scotland and finally he was called up for the British Lions in the same year as for Scotland, in 1950.

This tour was notable for being the first of the British and Irish Lions tours to occur after The Second World War (the previous tour was in 1938) and the first in which the British and Irish visitors wore red. For around 30 years the standard shirt was a now relatively unfamiliar but then famous navy blue design.

Budge was not unique in being an individual who played for a Canadian club and the Lions. As an aside, in his case at one point he played for the British Columbia Bears, sometimes known as the BC Bears. Rather, three other players also fulfill this criteria. None of these men played for Wales or Ireland, but two played for Scotland at international level and the other two for England, before they all played for the Lions.

Budge was unique, however, in having played for the Lions and having been born in Canada.

Family 
His granddaughter, Alison Christie, played 61 times for Scotland between 1994 and 2004

References

1920 births
1979 deaths
British & Irish Lions rugby union players from Canada
British & Irish Lions rugby union players from Scotland
Canadian expatriate rugby union players
Canadian expatriate sportspeople in Scotland
Canadian people of Scottish descent
Canadian rugby union players
Edinburgh Wanderers RFC players
Expatriate rugby union players in Scotland
People from Westman Region, Manitoba
Scotland international rugby union players
Scottish rugby union players
Sportspeople from Manitoba